Robert Schindler may refer to: 

 Founder of Schindler Group
 Terri Schiavo's father